Lake Engure is a lake in the western part of Latvia, in the Talsi District. It is the third largest lake in the country after Lake Lubāns and Lake Rāzna.

Lake Engure is an ancient sea lagoon, divided from the sea by a 1.5 - 2.5 km wide sand bar with dunes. Its outflow is the artificial Mersraga channel, dug in 1842. It is eutrophic, mostly overgrown with reeds, and contains 16 species of fish.

The whole lake and its vicinity have been included in the Lake Engure Nature Park  since 1999, although the first natural reserve was established here in 1957. It contains a floating base for ornithologists. The lake was included in Ramsar list of wetlands of international importance in 1995.

References

External links
  Nature Conservation Plan for Nature Park "Lake Engure"
  www.ezeri.lv database

Engure
Ramsar sites in Latvia
Important Bird Areas of Latvia